DXAB-TV, channel 21, was the flagship station of Philippine sports television network ABS-CBN Sports and Action (S+A), a fully owned subsidiary of AMCARA Broadcasting Network. Its studio and transmitter are located at the ABS-CBN Broadcast Complex, Broadcast Ave., Shrine Hills, Matina, Davao City.

On May 5, 2020, S+A Davao went off-air, due to cease and desist order from the National Telecommunications Commission, together with ABS-CBN and MOR after its legislative franchise expired on May 4.

See also
ABS-CBN
ABS-CBN Sports and Action
DXAS-TV
DXRR
DXAB
Studio 23 (the former name of ABS-CBN Sports and Action)
ABS-CBN Sports and Action stations

ABS-CBN Sports and Action stations
Television stations in Davao City
Television channels and stations established in 1996